The John Courtney Murray Award is the highest honor bestowed by the Catholic Theological Society of America, named after John Courtney Murray, the great American theologian known for his work on religious liberty.

Winners 

 2021: Susan K. Wood, S.C.L
2019: James F. Keenan, S.J.
 2018: M. Shawn Copeland
 2017: Francis Xavier Clooney, S.J.
 2016: Orlando O. Espín
 2015: Joseph A. Komonchak
 2014: John T. Pawlikowski, O.S.M.
 2013: Anne E. Patrick, S.N.J.M.
 2012: Terrence W. Tilley
 2011: James A. Coriden
 2010: Peter C. Phan
 2009: David Bakewell Burrell, C.S.C
 2008: Lisa Sowle Cahill
 2007: Virgilio Elizondo
 2006: Sandra M. Schneiders, I.H.M.
 2005: Robert Schreiter, C.PP.S.
 2004: Elizabeth A. Johnson, C.S.J.
 2003: Michael A. Fahey, S.J.
 2002: Kenan Osborne, O.F.M.
 2001: Agnes Cunningham, S.S.C.M.
 2000: Michael J. Buckley, S.J.
 1999: Ladislas Orsy, S.J.
 1998: David Hollenbach, S.J.
 1997: Anne Carr, B.V.M.
 1996: David N. Power, O.M.I.
 1995: John T. & Denise Carmody
 1994: Francis A. Sullivan, S.J.
 1993: Kilian P. McDonnell, O.S.B.
 1992: Margaret A. Farley, R.S.M.
 1991: Thomas F. O’Meara, O.P.
 1990: Frederick R. McManus
 1989: Patrick Granfield, O.S.B.
 1988: The Most Rev. Richard J. Sklba
 1987: Walter H. Principe, C.S.B.
 1986: Gregory Baum
 1985: Zachary J. Hayes, O.F.M.
 1984: Monika Hellwig
 1983: William J. Hill, O.P.
 1982: George J. Dyer
 1981: Gerard S. Sloyan
 1980: David W. Tracy
 1979: Bernard Cooke
 1978: Edward Kilmartin, S.J.
 1977: Frederick E. Crowe, S.J.
 1976: Richard. P. McBrien
 1975: Carl J. Peter
 1974: George H. Tavard, A.A.
 1973: Bernard J.F. Lonergan, S.J.
 1972: Charles E. Curran

References

External links
 Catholic Theological Society of America

Catholic ecclesiastical decorations
Awards established in 1972